Pietro Belluschi (August 18, 1899 – February 14, 1994) was an Italian-American architect. A leading figure in modern architecture, he was responsible for the design of over 1,000 buildings.

Born in Italy, Belluschi began his architectural career as a draftsman in a Portland, Oregon firm. He achieved a national reputation within about 20 years, largely for his 1947 aluminum-clad Equitable Building. In 1951 he was named the dean of the MIT School of Architecture and Planning, where he served until 1965, also working as collaborator and design consultant for many high-profile commissions, most famously the 1963 Pan Am Building. He won the American Institute of Architects' Gold Medal in 1972.

Early life

Pietro Belluschi was born in Ancona, Italy, in 1899. He grew up in Italy and served in the Italian armed forces during World War I when Italy was allied with Great Britain, France, and later the United States. Serving in the army he fought against the Austrians at the battles of Caporetto and Vittorio Veneto. After the war, Belluschi studied at the University of Rome, earning a degree in civil engineering in 1922.

He moved to the United States in 1923, despite speaking no English, and finished his education—as an exchange student on a scholarship—at Cornell University with a second degree in civil engineering. Instead of returning to Italy, he worked briefly as a mining engineer in Idaho earning $5 per day, but he then joined the architectural office of A. E. Doyle in Portland, living in Goose Hollow. He remained in the U.S., as friends in Italy had cautioned him to not return home because of the rise to power of Benito Mussolini and the Fascist government.

Career

At Doyle's office, Belluschi rose rapidly, soon becoming chief designer. After Doyle died in 1928, the firm took him into partnership in 1933. By 1943, Belluschi had assumed control of the firm by buying out all the other partners and was practicing under his own name.

In 1951, Belluschi became Dean of the architecture and planning school at the Massachusetts Institute of Technology, a position he held until 1965. When he accepted the position of dean and moved to Massachusetts, he transferred his office in Portland to the architecture firm Skidmore, Owings and Merrill. The move reduced his annual income from $150,000 to a salary of $15,000, but was prompted by health concerns attributable to the long hours of managing his office while still designing buildings.

Belluschi emerged as a leader in the development of American Modern architecture, with the design of several buildings reflecting the influence of the International Style and his awareness of the technological opportunities of new materials. Most important was the Equitable Building (1944–47) in Portland, Oregon: a concrete frame office block clad in aluminum, and considered the first office building with a completely sealed air-conditioned environment.

Belluschi's churches and residences differed from his commercial works. Although of Modern design, they fit within the development of the Pacific Northwest regional Modern idiom as they frequently used regional materials (particularly wood) and were often integrated with their suburban or rural sites.

Awards and honors
Belluschi was elected a Fellow of the American Academy of Arts and Sciences in 1952.  In 1953, he was elected into the National Academy of Design as an Associate member, and became a full member in 1957. He served as a presidential appointee on the U.S. Commission of Fine Arts from 1950 to 1955.  He was a Fellow in the American Institute of Architects (AIA), and was awarded the AIA Gold Medal, the highest award given by the institute, in 1972. He was awarded the National Medal of Arts by the National Endowment for the Arts in 1991 for his lifetime achievements. Belluschi was on the jury that selected the winning design for the Vietnam Veterans Memorial in Washington, D.C.

Later life
After leaving MIT in 1965, he continued to work. Belluschi would design and consult on both buildings and issues surrounding urban planning. Pietro Belluschi was married first to Helen Hemmila on December 1, 1934, the mother of his two sons, Peter and Anthony. His son Anthony Belluschi is an architect. After his wife's death in 1962, he married in 1965 to Marjorie or Margaret (1920–2009). Pietro Belluschi died in Portland on February 14, 1994.

Selected works

Belluschi's designs include:

 Pacific Telephone and Telegraph Company Building, southern addition, Portland, 1926
 Pacific Building, Portland, 1926
 Public Service Building, Portland, 1927
 Belluschi Building, Portland Art Museum (NRHP), 1932
 Guardians' Lodge (1929), Kiwanis Lodge (1931), Uncle Toby's Story House (1932), and Blue Wing Lodge (1936), Camp Namanu, Sandy, Oregon
 Northrup Library (now T. J. Day Hall) at Linfield University, McMinnville, 1936
 Library Building (now Smullin Hall) at Willamette University, Salem, 1938
 St. Thomas More Catholic Church, Portland, 1940
 Peter Kerr House, Gearhart, Oregon, 1941
 Chapel, River View Cemetery, Portland, 1942
 Korten Music Store, Longview, Washington, 1946
 Sweeney, Straub and Dimm Printing Plant, Portland (NRHP), 1946
 Emmanuel Lutheran Church, Longview, Washington, 1946
 Burkes House, Portland, 1947
 Oregonian Building, Portland, 1947
 Baxter Hall and Collins Hall, Willamette University, Salem, 1947
 Charles and Blanche Sprague Weekend House, also known as Thetford Lodge, Little North Santiam River, Oregon, 1947
 Psychology Building, Reed College, Portland, 1947–1948
 Breitenbush Hall, Oregon State Hospital, Salem (NRHP), 1948 (demolished 2017)
 Equitable Building, Portland, 1948
 First Presbyterian Church, Cottage Grove, Oregon (NRHP), 1948
 Percy L. Menefee Ranch House, Yamhill, Oregon, 1948
 Sacred Heart Church, Lake Oswego, Oregon, 1949
 Zion Lutheran Church, Portland (NRHP), 1950
 Federal Reserve Bank of San Francisco, Portland Branch, 1950
 Central Lutheran Church, Portland, 1951
 St. Philip Neri Catholic Church, Portland, 1952
 Tucker Maxon School, Portland, 1953
 YWCA building, Salem, 1954
 Marion County Courthouse and World War II Memorial, Salem, 1954
 Trinity Lutheran Church, Walnut Creek, California, 1954
 Temple Israel, Swampcott, Massachusetts, 1953-1956
 First Lutheran Church, Boston, 1954–1957
 Cedar Lane Unitarian Universalist Church, Bethesda, Maryland, 1955
 Temple Adath Israel of the Main Line, with Charles Frederick Wise, Merion, Pennsylvania, 1956–1957
 Church of the Redeemer (Baltimore), 1958
 Bennington College Library, Bennington, Vermont, 1957–1958
 Central Lutheran Church, Eugene, Oregon, 1959
 Temple B'rith Kodesh, Rochester, New York, 1959–1963
 Goucher College Center, Towson, Maryland, 1960
 Trinity Episcopal Church, Concord, Massachusetts, dedicated October 6, 1963
 First Methodist Church, Duluth, Minnesota, 1962–1969
 The Alice Tully Hall at the Juilliard School within the Lincoln Center, New York City, 1963–1969
 Pan Am Building, Belluschi and Walter Gropius as design consultants to Emery Roth & Sons, New York City, 1963
 Rohm and Haas Corporate Headquarters, with George M. Ewing Co., Philadelphia, Pennsylvania, 1964
 Church of the Christian Union, Rockford, Illinois, 1964-1965
 Hoffman Columbia Plaza, now Unitus Plaza, Portland, 1966
 Immanuel Lutheran Church, Silverton, Oregon, 1966
 Saint Joseph's Roman Catholic Church, Roseburg, Oregon, 1968
 555 California Street, as consultant to Wurster, Benardi and Emmons and Skidmore, Owings and Merrill, San Francisco, 1969
 One Boston Place, with Emery Roth & Sons, Boston, 1970
 Tower Square, also known as BayState West, with Eduardo Catalano, Springfield, Massachusetts, 1970
 University of Virginia School of Architecture, 1970
 Woodbrook Baptist Church, Towson, Maryland, 1970
 Cathedral of Saint Mary of the Assumption, San Francisco (collaborating with Pier Luigi Nervi and others), 1971
 Clark Art Institute, with The Architects Collaborative, Williamstown, Massachusetts, 1973
 100 East Pratt Street, with Emery Roth & Sons, Baltimore, 1975
 Joseph Meyerhoff Symphony Hall, Baltimore, 1978–1982
 Louise M. Davies Symphony Hall, with Skidmore, Owings and Merrill, San Francisco, 1980
 One Financial Center, Boston, 1983
 US Bancorp Tower, as consultant to Skidmore, Owings and Merrill, Portland, 1983
 Chapel of Christ the Teacher, University of Portland, 1986
 United Hebrew Congregation, Chesterfield, Missouri, 1986–1989
 Murray Hills Christian Church, Beaverton, Oregon (1987–89)
 Centennial Tower and Wheeler Sports Center, George Fox University, McMinnville, Oregon, 1991
 Portsmouth Abbey School campus, Portsmouth, Rhode Island; Belluschi designed 14 of the 27 buildings on campus between 1960 and 1991

References

External links 

 Oregon Encyclopedia biography
 1983 interview from the Smithsonian's Archives of American Art
Photographs of Pietro Belluschi's works from the Phyllis and Robert Massar Photograph Collection of Pacific Northwest Architecture - University of Washington Digital Collections

1899 births
1994 deaths
20th-century American architects
 
Cornell University College of Engineering alumni
Fellows of the American Institute of Architects
United States National Medal of Arts recipients
Architects from Portland, Oregon
Modernist architects
Italian emigrants to the United States
Italian military personnel of World War I
American ecclesiastical architects
People from Ancona
Architects of Roman Catholic churches
Architects of cathedrals
Fellows of the American Academy of Arts and Sciences
MIT School of Architecture and Planning faculty
Death in Oregon
Recipients of the AIA Gold Medal
Members of the American Academy of Arts and Letters